Kilcummin is a Gaelic Athletic Association club from Kilcummin, near Killarney in County Kerry, Ireland.  The club, which was founded in 1910, fields teams in Gaelic football only, with no hurling played.  Together with 12 other football clubs, they form the East Kerry Division of Kerry GAA. The East Kerry board runs its own competitions for clubs within the division, including the East Kerry Senior Football Championship and the East Kerry Junior Football Championship.

Honours
 Kerry Senior Football Championship (0): (runners-up 1903, 1913, 2002)
 Kerry Intermediate Football Championship (2): 1997, 2018
 Munster Intermediate Club Football Championship (1): 2018
 All-Ireland Intermediate Club Football Championship (1): 2019
 Kerry Junior Football Championship (2): 1973, 1991
 Kerry Minor Football Championship (1): 2010
 East Kerry Senior Football Championship (2): 1925, 1973
 East Kerry Junior Football Championship (6): 1977, 1983, 1989, 1992, 1993, 2018

Notable players
 Brendan Kealy
 Seán Kelly
 Mike McCarthy
 Mark Moynihan
 Dee O'Connor

References

External links
 

Gaelic games clubs in County Kerry
Gaelic football clubs in County Kerry